Harris Dickinson (born 24 June 1996) is an English actor. He began his career with a starring role in the drama Beach Rats (2017), for which he was nominated for the Independent Spirit Award for Best Male Lead. He has since played John Paul Getty III in the FX drama series Trust (2018), and starred in the films Maleficent: Mistress of Evil (2019), The King's Man (2021), Triangle of Sadness, and Where the Crawdads Sing (both 2022).

Early life
Dickinson was born 24 June 1996 in Leytonstone, East London, and grew up in Highams Park. At seventeen, he dropped out of school, where he was trying to study film and theatre. Dickinson almost opted for a career in the Royal Marines, before being persuaded to return to the theatre by his coach at RAW Academy in London.

Acting career
In 2016, Dickinson was cast as Frankie, a young man struggling with his sexuality, in Eliza Hittman's film Beach Rats. The Times critic Ed Potton highlighted Dickinson as having "perfected a south Brooklyn accent" as Frankie. For his performance, Dickinson was nominated for the Independent Spirit Award for Best Male Lead and the Gotham Independent Film Award for Breakthrough Actor.

In 2018, Dickinson starred in the FX drama television series Trust as John Paul Getty III. In 2019, he voiced the character Gurjin in the Netflix series The Dark Crystal: Age of Resistance. He also starred in The Darkest Minds.

In 2021, Dickinson starred in the third installment of the Kingsman film series, The King's Man, as Conrad Oxford. The role gained him his first BAFTA Film Award nomination for the EE Rising Star Award.

In 2022, he starred in Triangle of Sadness as a model on a cruise. The film premiered at the 2022 Cannes Film Festival and won the Palme d'Or. Reviewing the film, Varietys Peter Debruge wrote Dickinson "brings a kind of fragile vulnerability to the Abercrombie frat-boy type". The film achieved widespread acclaim and a nomination for Best Picture at the 95th Oscars.

Dickinson co-starred in Where the Crawdads Sing, a film adaptation of Delia Owens' novel of the same name, which was released in July 2022. Also in 2022, he was cast in the FX limited series Retreat.

In 2023, Dickinson starred in Scrapper as Jason, an estranged father who reconnects with his daughter. The film was written and directed by Charlotte Regan, and premiered at the 2023 Sundance Film Festival.

Filmography

Film

Television

Awards and nominations

References

External links

 
 

1996 births
21st-century English male actors
English male film actors
English male television actors
English male voice actors
Living people
People from Leytonstone